The Granite pebblesnail, scientific name Somatogyrus hinkleyi, is a species of minute freshwater snails with an operculum, aquatic gastropod molluscs or micromolluscs in the family Hydrobiidae.

This species is endemic to the United States. The Granite River is found in Minnesota.

References

 

Endemic fauna of the United States
Molluscs of the United States
Freshwater snails
Somatogyrus
Gastropods described in 1904
Taxonomy articles created by Polbot